"Niranjan Debbarma" is a Tipra Indian politician from Tripura who won the election in 1977,1993,1998,2008 
and 2013 as a candidate of Communist Party of India (Marxist). He became MLA of Golaghati in 1977,1993, 1998 and MLA of Takarjala in 2008 and 2013

He is one of the prominent leader of Communist Party of India (Marxist)

References

Living people
Tripura MLAs 1977–1983
Tripura MLAs 1993–1998
Tripura MLAs 1998–2003
Tripura MLAs 2008–2013
Tripura MLAs 2013–2018
Communist Party of India (Marxist) politicians from Tripura
Year of birth missing (living people)